Rape is a 1971 false document Norwegian film by female director Anja Breien. The film deals with a young man who is mistakenly accused of one rape and one attempted rape and how he is being processed by the judicial system. The film is shot in black and white and is divided into sections corresponding to the respective sections of Norwegian trial law which the accused encounters.

External links
 

Norwegian crime drama films
1970s Norwegian-language films
1971 films
Films directed by Anja Breien
1971 drama films